Buganda Investments and Commercial Undertakings Limited (BICUL), is a holding company of the investment and business entities, owned by the Kingdom of Buganda, a constitutional monarchy in modern-day Uganda Kabaka of Buganda

Location
The coordinates of the headquarters of BICUL are 0°18'36.0"N, 32°33'30.0"E (Latitude:0.310007; Longitude:32.558333).

Overview
BICUL is the investment arm of Buganda Kingdom. The Kingdom's investments include real estate developments, media houses and other joint ventures.

Subsidiaries and associated companies
The companies that comprise BICUL include the following:

 Central Broadcasting Service, 88.8 FM and 89.2 FM
 Buganda Broadcasting Services- Majorly a luganda television station.
 K2 telecom
 Buganda Cultural and Development Foundation (BUCADEF), an NGO
 Buganda Heritage & Tourism Board
 Namulondo Investments Limited
 Majestic Brands Limited
 Muteesa 1 Royal University

See also
 Buganda 
 Kabaka of Buganda
 Katikkiro of Buganda

References

External links
 BICUL Homepage

Investment companies of Uganda
Central Region, Uganda
Financial services companies established in 1993
Holding companies established in 1993
1993 establishments in Uganda